Oriovac railway station is a railway station on Novska–Tovarnik railway, located in Oriovac. The railroad continues to Nova Kapela–Batrina in one direction and to Sibinj in the other. Oriovac railway station consists of 5 railway tracks.

See also 
 Croatian Railways
 Zagreb–Belgrade railway

References 

Railway stations in Croatia
Buildings and structures in Brod-Posavina County